George R. Walker was an American football and basketball coach. He was the head football coach at St. Augustine's University in Raleigh, North Carolina from 1955 to 1960.  Walker was also the head basketball coach at St. Augustine's from 1955 to 1957.

Head coaching record

Football

References

Year of birth missing
Year of death missing
St. Augustine's Falcons football coaches
St. Augustine's Falcons men's basketball coaches